Denny Domingues Landzaat (born 6 May 1976) is a Dutch former footballer who mostly played as a central midfielder or defensive midfielder and current assistant manager of Ekstraklasa side Lech Poznań.

Early life
Landzaat was born and raised in Amsterdam. He is of Moluccan descent.

Club career

Early career
Landzaat was educated in Ajax's youth academy, but only played one league match for the club before moving on to have lengthy spells with MVV, Willem II and AZ. He was AZ's captain in the 2005–06 season, as they finished second in the Eredivisie.

Wigan Athletic
Landzaat joined Premier League club Wigan Athletic on 18 July 2006 for an undisclosed fee, thought to be £2.5 million. He signed a three-year contract with the club. He scored his first goal for Wigan against Reading in a 2–3 loss on 30 January 2007. He followed this with a 30-yard strike at the Emirates Stadium in a 1–2 defeat to Arsenal on 11 February. On 18 August 2007, Landzaat converted a penalty against Sunderland to score his first home goal for Wigan at the JJB Stadium. He also scored the first goal in Wigan's 5–3 win over local rivals Blackburn Rovers.

Feyenoord
On 25 January 2008, Landzaat returned to the Netherlands to join Feyenoord for a £1 million transfer fee. He signed a three-and-a-half-year contract with the club. He scored his first goal for Feyenoord on his debut, in the 3–3 draw against Heracles on 24 February 2008.

Twente
After his contract with Feyenoord expired, Landzaat signed a one-year deal with Twente in August 2010, which was extended during the season and again in the following season. He won the KNVB Cup in 2010–11.

Willem II
After his contract with Twente expired in the summer of 2013, Landzaat was unable to find a new team for the start of the 2013–14 season. However, on 16 January 2014, he signed a contract with Willem II until the end of the season. He retired from professional football at the end of the season, having been a part of the team that helped Willem II back to the Eredivisie.

International career
Landzaat was a member of the Dutch squad at the 1995 FIFA World Youth Championship. Landzaat also competed in the 2006 World Cup. On 21 May 2008, Landzaat was released from Marco van Basten's UEFA Euro 2008 provisional squad.

Coaching career
Landzaat ended his career in the summer 2014 and then signed a contract with AZ Alkmaar until 2017 as an individual coach for the first team and for Jong AZ. One year later, he was also appointed assistant manager to Martin Haar for Jong AZ.

From January 2016, he became manager of AZ's U15 team but still retained his coaching role for the Jong and first team's and also as assistant manager for Jong AZ. In the summer 2016, he then took charge of the club's U17 squad and beside that, he also functioned as assistant manager under Danny Blind for the Netherlands national football team in an advisor role. In the summer 2017, he signed a new one-year contract and was appointed assistant manager for Jong AZ, once again under Martin Haar.

In the 2018–19 season, Landzaat was appointed assistant to Giovanni van Bronckhorst. Jaap Stam was appointed manager for Feyenoord in the summer 2019. When Stam stepped down on 28 October 2019, Landzaat also did. One week later, he was appointed assistant manager of Henk ten Cate at Saudi Professional League club Al-Ittihad.

On 19 June 2022, he was announced as the assistant manager under John van den Brom at Polish Ekstraklasa defending champions Lech Poznań.

Career statistics

Honours
Ajax
Eredivisie: 1995–96

MVV
Eerste Divisie: 1996–97

Feyenoord
KNVB Cup: 2007–08

Twente
KNVB Cup: 2010–11
Johan Cruyff Shield: 2010

Willem II
Eerste Divisie: 2013–14

References

External links
 Denny Landzaat at Voetbal International  – 
 
 
 

1976 births
Living people
Expatriate footballers in England
Dutch footballers
Dutch people of Indonesian descent
Dutch people of Moluccan descent
Dutch expatriate footballers
Netherlands youth international footballers
Netherlands international footballers
SC Buitenveldert players
AFC Ajax players
Willem II (football club) players
AZ Alkmaar players
MVV Maastricht players
Wigan Athletic F.C. players
Feyenoord players
FC Twente players
2006 FIFA World Cup players
Eredivisie players
Eerste Divisie players
Premier League players
Footballers from Amsterdam
Indo people
Dutch expatriate sportspeople in England
Dutch expatriate sportspeople in Saudi Arabia
Dutch expatriate sportspeople in Poland
Association football midfielders
AZ Alkmaar non-playing staff
Feyenoord non-playing staff